Events in the year 1995 in Portugal.

Incumbents
President: Mário Soares
Prime Minister: Aníbal Cavaco Silva (until 28 October), António Guterres (from 28 October)

Events
 1 October - Legislative election

Arts and entertainment

Portugal participated in the Eurovision Song Contest 1995 with Tó Cruz and the song "Baunilha e chocolate".

Publications
Blindness, by José Saramago

Sports
In association football, for the first-tier league seasons, see 1994–95 Primeira Divisão and 1995–96 Primeira Divisão; for the cup seasons, see 1994–95 Taça de Portugal and 1995–96 Taça de Portugal; for the second-tier league seasons, see 1994–95 Segunda Divisão de Honra and 1995–96 Segunda Divisão de Honra; for the third-tier league seasons, see 1994–95 Segunda Divisão B and 1995–96 Segunda Divisão B; for the fourth-tier league seasons, see 1994–95 Terceira Divisão and 1995–96 Terceira Divisão.
 14–19 March - Algarve Cup
 3–10 April - Estoril Open
 10 June - Taça de Portugal Final
 23–30 July - FIBA Europe Under-16 Championship
 6 and 23 August - Supertaça Cândido de Oliveira
 24 September - Portuguese Grand Prix

Births
 4 January - Miguel Oliveira, motorcycle racer
 6 January - Raphael Guzzo, footballer (born in Brazil)
 11 January - Tiago Sá, footballer
 26 January - Cristian Ponde, footballer
 30 January - Tomás Podstawski, footballer
 23 February - Besugo, footballer
 18 March - Frederico Ferreira Silva, tennis player
 24 March - Núrio Fortuna, footballer
 25 March - Ricardo Tavares, footballer
 30 March - Ivo Tiago Santos Rodrigues, footballer
 7 April - Mauro Riquicho, footballer
 18 April - Francisco Geraldes, footballer
 18 June - João Graça, footballer
 18 June - Ricardo Santos, footballer
 25 July - Luís Manuel Gonçalves Silva, footballer
 30 July - Nélson Monte, footballer
 25 September - Hugo Viveiros, footballer
 21 October - Daniel Podence, footballer
 31 October - Joana Valle Costa, tennis player
 19 November - João Nunes (footballer, born 1995), Portuguese footballer
 9 December - José Costa, a normal guy
 15 December - Xéxé, footballer
 28 December - Marcos Lopes, footballer

Deaths
 21 March - João de Freitas do Amaral, politician and journalist
 14 April - António Lopes Ribeiro, film director
 16 August - António Vilar, actor
 8 November - Fernando Pinto Coelho Bello, competitive sailor
 18 December - António Roquete, footballer
 Carlos Dias, fencer
 Maria Inês Ribeiro da Fonseca, painter

References

 
Portugal
Years of the 20th century in Portugal
Portugal